The Raleigh Hotel is a resort hotel in South Fallsburg, New York, within the Borscht Belt region of the Catskill Mountains.

The hotel was established in 1937 as a popular "Kosher" destination catering to most traditional Jewish (observant and non-observant) travelers, as well as other religions welcomed. Situated on 200 acres of land in Upstate New York's Borscht Belt, located roughly 90 miles from New York City and just outside the village of Monticello, the Raleigh has hosted several entertainers such as Sammy Davis Jr., Jackie Mason, Milton Berle, and Rodney Dangerfield. For many decades, Barry Frank was the Master of Ceremonies at the resort.

The Raleigh's longtime owner Mannie Halbert died in 2004. The Raleigh temporarily closed in December 2005 and then reopened the following year under new ownership, as a retreat for mainly Orthodox Jews.

References

External links

Borscht Belt
Catskills
Buildings and structures in Sullivan County, New York
Hotels in New York (state)
Tourist attractions in Sullivan County, New York
Fallsburg, New York